Ed Chapman (born 1971), in Darwen, Lancashire is a mosaic artist, the son of artist Margaret Chapman who was from the Northern School.

Chapman became a professional artist in the 1990s. His artistic influences include Chuck Close, Robert Rauschenberg, and Jamie Reid. His work has sold in more than 25 countries, and has been exhibited in galleries in the UK and around the world.

He has created several 'firsts' in mosaic, including Jimi Hendrix from Fender guitar picks, tennis star  Andy Murray on carpet made from household items like tomato sauce and lipstick, Albert Einstein in metal, a chewing gum mosaic, a bullets mosaic and several others. Among his mosaics are portraits of David Bowie, Nelson Mandela, David Beckham in penny coins, Alan Sugar (done in sugar cubes) and Eric Cantona. Annie Lennox, Lemmy the founding member of Motörhead and chef Gordon Ramsay are among the clients who have commissioned a work by him. His portrait of Richard Burton incorporating 500 million-year-old Welsh slate was commissioned by the actor's widow Sally Burton in 2015 to mark 90 years since the actor's birth. The portrait is at Swansea University.

Chapman's mosaic of Jimi Hendrix, made of 5000 Fender guitar picks was auctioned for £23,000/$35000, one of the highest prices ever paid for a mosaic piece of art - with proceeds going to Cancer Research UK.

References

The Palette Pages Interview with Ed Chapman

Living people
British artists
Mosaic artists
1971 births
People from Darwen